Morgan Stickney (born June 16, 1997) is an American Paralympic swimmer who represented the United States at the 2020 Summer Paralympics.

Career
Stickney represented the United States at the 2020 Summer Paralympics in the women's 400 metre freestyle S8 event and won a gold medal. She also competed in the women's  medley relay 34pts and won a gold medal.

On April 14, 2022, Stickney was named to the roster to represent the United States at the 2022 World Para Swimming Championships.

References

External links
 
 
 

1997 births
Living people
American disabled sportspeople
American female freestyle swimmers
Paralympic swimmers of the United States
Paralympic gold medalists for the United States
Paralympic medalists in swimming
Medalists at the World Para Swimming Championships
Medalists at the 2020 Summer Paralympics
Swimmers at the 2020 Summer Paralympics
21st-century American women
S8-classified Paralympic swimmers